Bodo Illgner (born 7 April 1967) is a German former professional footballer who played as a goalkeeper.
During his career he played for 1. FC Köln and Real Madrid, and helped West Germany to the 1990 World Cup, where he became the first goalkeeper to keep a clean sheet in a World Cup final.

Club career
Born in Koblenz, Illgner was a product of 1. FC Köln's youth system, and made his debut in the Bundesliga on 22 February 1986 at not yet 19, in a 3–1 away loss against Bayern Munich. From the 1987–88 season onwards, he became the club's undisputed starter – as successor of Harald Schumacher in both 1. FC Köln and the Germany national team – being voted as Best European Goalkeeper in 1991.

On 30 August 1996, already having started the campaign with Köln, Illgner was signed by Real Madrid, and played 40 La Liga matches in his first year to help the capital side to the national championship conquest. In the following he lost his place to Santiago Cañizares, but regained it in time to play in the final of the UEFA Champions League against Juventus FC (1–0 win).

In 1999–2000, Illgner was succeeded by 18-year-old Iker Casillas, after which he retired from football altogether.

In April 2013, he was named by Marca as a member of the "Best foreign eleven in Real Madrid's history".

International career
On 23 September 1987, Illgner made his debut for the West Germany national team in a 1–0 friendly home win against Denmark, and went on to back Eike Immel during UEFA Euro 1988. At the 1990 FIFA World Cup he, by now the country's first-choice, was in exceptional form, and commanded the backline which consisted of the experienced Klaus Augenthaler, Andreas Brehme, Thomas Berthold, Guido Buchwald and Jürgen Kohler (with Matthias Sammer taking Augenthaler's place at Euro 1992); in the semi-final, he saved a Stuart Pearce shot in the penalty shootout against England, and his team would overcome Argentina in the deciding match, where he would keep a clean sheet in the 1–0 success.

Overall, Illgner appeared 54 times for his country, and also played at the 1994 World Cup, surprisingly retiring after the quarter-final loss against Bulgaria although he was only 27.

Post-playing career
Illgner later went on to work as a pundit for Sky Deutschland and English language broadcasts of beIN Sport.

Career statistics

Club

Honours
Real Madrid
La Liga: 1996–97
Supercopa de España: 1997
UEFA Champions League: 1997–98, 1999–2000
Intercontinental Cup: 1998

Germany
FIFA World Cup: 1990
UEFA European Under-16 Championship: 1984

Individual
German Goalkeeper of the Year: 1989, 1990, 1991, 1992
Best European Goalkeeper: 1991
kicker Bundesliga Team of the Season: 1994–95

References

External links

1967 births
Living people
Sportspeople from Koblenz
Footballers from Rhineland-Palatinate
German footballers
Association football goalkeepers
Bundesliga players
1. FC Köln players
La Liga players
Real Madrid CF players
Germany under-21 international footballers
Germany international footballers
UEFA Euro 1988 players
1990 FIFA World Cup players
UEFA Euro 1992 players
1994 FIFA World Cup players
FIFA World Cup-winning players
German expatriate footballers
Expatriate footballers in Spain
German expatriate sportspeople in Spain
UEFA Champions League winning players
West German footballers